Johannes Schrumpf (9 November 1921 – 25 June 2007) was a Dutch professional footballer who played as a forward for SV SVV. He made one appearance for the Netherlands national team in 1950.

References

External links
 

1921 births
2007 deaths
Dutch footballers
Association football forwards
Netherlands international footballers
SV SVV players
Place of birth missing